is a passenger railway station located in the city of  Funabashi, Chiba Prefecture, Japan, operated by the private railway operator Shin-Keisei Electric Railway.

Lines
Takifudō Station is served by the Shin-Keisei Line, and is located 18.5 kilometers from the terminus of the line at Matsudo Station.

Station layout 
The station consists of two opposed side platforms, with an elevated station building.

Platforms

History
Takifudō Station was opened on August 26, 1948.

Passenger statistics
In fiscal 2018, the station was used by an average of 7,593 passengers daily.

Surrounding area
 Funabashi Municipal Otaki Junior High School
 Funabashi Municipal Futawa Elementary School
 Funabashi City Kanasugidai Elementary School

See also
 List of railway stations in Japan

References

External links

   Shin Keisei Railway Station information

Railway stations in Japan opened in 1948
Railway stations in Chiba Prefecture
Funabashi